Roosevelt Junior High School is a historic school located at 701 West Grand Avenue in Decatur, Illinois. Built from 1917 to 1921, the school was the second exclusive middle school in the city behind the now closed Centennial Junior High School. Decatur architectural firm Brooks, Bramhall & Dague designed the school in the Collegiate Gothic style, a popular choice for educational buildings at the time. The three-story building is built from red brick and features terra cotta trim designed to resemble stone. The front entrance is designed to resemble a castle's keep, with octagonal turrets on either side and the extensive use of terra cotta to form arches, piers and spandrels. The rest of the building features buttresses and Gothic arches throughout, and a battlement surrounds the edge of the roof. The school operated continuously from its opening until 2000.

The school was added to the National Register of Historic Places on May 9, 2002.

References

School buildings on the National Register of Historic Places in Illinois
Gothic Revival architecture in Illinois
School buildings completed in 1921
Buildings and structures in Decatur, Illinois
National Register of Historic Places in Macon County, Illinois
1921 establishments in Illinois